Harriet was launched at Pictou, Nova Scotia, in 1798. She  was the first large ship built in Nova Scotia and was sold in London. She traded widely from London, primarily to North America. She foundered on 3 November 1818.

Career
Harriet first appeared in Lloyd's Register (LR) and as Harriot in the Register of Shipping (RS), both in 1800. The entry in LR gave her origin as New Brunswick (corrected in later volumes to Nova Scotia); RS gave her origin as Nova Scotia. Harriot, Hurry, master, arrived at Liverpool from Pictou in September 1800.

Captain Francis J. Hurry acquired a letter of marque on 10 October 1800.

When Hurry and Harriott arrived at Torbay Hurry reported that he had seen three vessels in various states of distress as he left Honduras.

On 8 November 1808 the transport Harriet, Parr, master, sailed from Quebec. However, she had to put back leaky, and dad lost her anchor and cables. She was to winter over at Quebec. 

On 22 May 1815 Harriet, Miller, master, ran onshore near the Black Rock while sailing from Liverpool to Newfoundland. She was gotten off and brought into dock, having sustained damages.

Fate
She had lost her masts and had 5 feet of water in her hold. Rebecca, of Salem, rescued Graham and the crew and later put them aboard an English schooner sailing to Halifax, Nova Scotia.

Citations and references
Citations

References
 

1798 ships
Ships built in Canada
Age of Sail merchant ships of England
Maritime incidents in 1815
Maritime incidents in 1818